Psychosomatic Medicine is a peer-reviewed medical journal published nine times per year by the American Psychosomatic Society. It covers all aspects of psychosomatic medicine. It was established in 1939. According to the Journal Citation Reports, the journal has a 2020 impact factor of 4.312.

See also
List of psychiatry journals

References

External links

American Psychosomatic Society

Publications established in 1939
Psychosomatic medicine journals
English-language journals
Lippincott Williams & Wilkins academic journals
Somatic psychology
9 times per year journals